The Central Committee of the 26th Congress of the Communist Party of the Soviet Union was in session from 1981 until 1986. It elected, at its 1st Plenary Session, the 26th Politburo, the 26th Secretariat and the 26th Party Control Committee of the Communist Party of the Soviet Union.

Plenums
The Central Committee was not a permanent institution. It convened plenary sessions. 15 CC plenary sessions were held between the 26th Congress and the 27th Congress. When the CC was not in session, decision-making power was vested in the internal bodies of the CC itself; that is, the Politburo and the Secretariat. None of these bodies were permanent either; typically they convened several times a month.

Composition

Members

Candidates

References

Citations

Bibliography
 

Central Committee of the Communist Party of the Soviet Union
1981 establishments in the Soviet Union
1986 disestablishments in the Soviet Union